This is a list of people associated with Tsinghua University in Beijing.

Politics and public service

People's Republic of China 
Hu Jintao – former General Secretary of the Chinese Communist Party, President of China
Xi Jinping – current General Secretary of the Chinese Communist Party, President of China
Zhu Rongji – former Premier of the People's Republic of China, founding dean of Tsinghua University School of Economics and Management
Wu Guanzheng – member of the Politburo Standing Committee of the Chinese Communist Party
Huang Ju – former Vice Premier of the People's Republic of China
Zhou Xiaochuan – governor of the People's Bank of China
Jia Chunwang – head of Ministry of State Security 1985–1998, then Minister of Public Security
Lou Jiwei - Minister of Finance, People's Republic of China

Republic of China 
Sun Li-jen - Kuomintang general
Qi Xueqi - Kuomintang General

Malaysia 
Tengku Zafrul Aziz - Minister of Finance

Science and technology 
Qingyan Chen - mechanical engineer
Shiing-Shen Chern - mathematician, Wolf Prize winner (1984)
Wang Ganchang - nuclear physicist
Chao Ko - mathematician
Ma Weiming - electric engineer and naval designer
Zhao Jiuzhang - physicist
Wu Youxun - physicist
Jinhua Lu - Fellow of the Institute of Electrical and Electronics Engineers
Xiaoquig Ding - Department of Electronic Engineering professor and supervisor

Business and entrepreneurship 
Min Chueh Chang - co-inventor of the combined oral contraceptive pill (1933)
Tim Cook -  American business executive, chairman of the advisory board for Tsinghua University's economics school
Stephen A. Schwarzman - billionaire co-founder and CEO of the Blackstone Group, founder of the Schwarzman Scholars at Tsinghua University
Jiang Bin - billionaire co-founder of GoerTek
Sun Hongbin (born 1963), billionaire real estate developer

Arts and social science

Education 
Zhou Peiyuan - former president of Peking University

Others 
Amy Lyons - Australian internet personality active in China, took Chinese courses at Tsinghua
Zhang Yuzhe - astronomer
Jin Tianming - pastor of Shouwang Church, a very influential church in Beijing

Faculty

Nobel Laureates

Yang Chen Ning - physicist, Nobel Prize laureate (physics, 1957)

References

Tsinghua University
Tsinghua